Caloptilia aeolastis is a moth of the family Gracillariidae. It is known from Brazil.

References

aeolastis
Gracillariidae of South America
Moths described in 1920